William M. Finkelstein is an American screenwriter, television producer, actor and television director.

He has worked as a writer and producer on Law & Order, Brooklyn South, Murder One, L.A. Law, Cop Rock, NYPD Blue, and The Good Fight. He co-created Brooklyn South with frequent collaborators David Milch, Steven Bochco and Bill Clark. He won the Emmy Award for Outstanding Drama Series for L.A. Law in both 1989 and 1990. He was nominated for the award again in 2001 for Law & Order. He has been nominated 4 times for the Emmy Award for Outstanding Writing for a Drama Series. He also wrote the script for Werner Herzog's Bad Lieutenant: Port of Call New Orleans to largely positive acclaim.

Awards and nominations

References

External links

1952 births
American male screenwriters
American television writers
Living people
American male television writers
American television producers